The Great Wall of Gorgan is a Sasanian-era defense system located near modern Gorgan in the Golestān Province of northeastern Iran, at the southeastern corner of the Caspian Sea. The western, Caspian Sea, end of the wall is near the remains of the fort at: ; the eastern end of the wall, near the town of Pishkamar, is near the remains of the fort at: . The title coordinate is for the location of the remains of a fort midway along the wall.

The wall is located at a geographic narrowing between the Caspian Sea and the mountains of northeastern Iran. It is one of several Caspian Gates at the eastern part of a region known in antiquity as Hyrcania, on the nomadic route from the northern steppes to the Iranian heartland. The wall is believed to have protected the Sassanian Empire to the south from the peoples to the north, probably the White Huns. In his book Empires and Walls, Chaichian (2014) questions the validity of this interpretation using historical evidence of potential political-military threats in the region as well as the economic geography of Gorgan Wall's environs. It is described as "amongst the most ambitious and sophisticated frontier walls" ever built in the world, and the most important of the Sassanian defense fortifications.

It is surpassed only by the walls systems of Great Wall of China as the longest single-segment building and the longest defensive wall in existence.

Name

Among archaeologists the wall is also known as "The Red Snake" (Turkmen: Qizil Alan) because of the colour of its bricks. In Persian, it was popularized by the name "Alexander Barrier" ( Sadd-i-Iskandar) or "Alexander's Wall", as Alexander the Great is thought by early Muslims to have passed through the Caspian Gates on his hasty march to Hyrcania and the east. It is also known as the "Anushirvân Barrier" ( Sadd-i Anushiravan) and "Firuz/Piruz Barrier", and is officially referred to as "Gorgan Defence Wall".

Description

The building materials consist of mud-brick, fired brick, gypsum, and mortar. Clay was also used during the early Parthian period. Mud-bricks were more popular in the early period in the construction of forts and cities, while fired bricks became popular in the later period. Sometimes one brick was set in the vertical position, with two horizontal rows of bricks laid above and below. The sizes of mud or fired bricks differ, but in general the standard size was 40 × 40 × 10 cm. The fired bricks were made from the local loess soil, and fired in kilns along the line of the wall.

This wall starts from the Caspian coast, circles north of Gonbade Kavous (ancient Gorgan, or Jorjan in Arabic), continues towards the northeast, and vanishes in the Pishkamar Mountains.
The wall lies slightly to the north of a local river, and features a  ditch that conducted water along most of the wall.

In 1999 a logistical archaeological survey was conducted regarding the wall due to problems in development projects, especially during construction of the Golestan Dam, which irrigates all the areas covered by the wall. At the point of the connection of the wall and the drainage canal from the dam, architects discovered the remains of the Great Wall of Gorgan. The 40 identified fortresses vary in dimension and shape but the majority are square fortresses, made of the same brickwork as the wall itself and at the same period. Due to many difficulties in development and agricultural projects, archaeologists have been assigned to mark the boundary of the historical find by laying cement blocks.

Larger than Hadrian's Wall and the Antonine Wall taken together (two separate structures in Britain that marked the northern limits of the Roman Empire), it has been called the greatest monument of its kind between Europe and China.  The wall is second only to the walls that make up the Great Wall of China as the longest defensive wall in existence, and although now in substantial disrepair, it was perhaps even more solidly built than the early forms of the Great Wall.

Route

The route, from east to west, is represented by the coordinates of the remains of the following forts and other features which lie along the wall. The coordinates and fort numbers, etc. are from Wikimapia:

East end of wall

West end of wall

Dating
Dr. Kiani, who led the archaeological team in 1971, believed that the wall was built during the Parthian Empire (247 BC–224 AD), and that it was reconstructed and restored during the Sassanid era (3rd to 7th century AD). In 2005 a team excavated samples of charcoal from the many brick kilns along the wall, and samples from the Gorgan Wall and the smaller Wall of Tammishe (location of a drowned fort at the northern end: ; location of a fortlet or watchtower at the inland end); OSL and radiocarbon dating indicated a date for both walls in the late 5th or 6th century AD. These dates suggest that the current wall, at least, is Sassanid rather than Parthian, and that the current structure did not yet exist, some 800 years earlier, in the time of Alexander the Great (died 323 BC). If Alexander encountered a barrier at this location it was a predecessor of the current wall.

If we assumed that the forts were occupied as densely as those on Hadrian's Wall, then the garrison on the Gorgan Wall would have been in the order of 30,000 men. Models, taking into account the size and room number of the barrack blocks in the Gorgan Wall forts and likely occupation density, produce figures between 15,000 and 36,000 soldiers. Even the lowest estimate suggests a strong and powerful army, all the more remarkable as our investigations focused just on 200km of vulnerable frontier, a small fraction of the thousands of kilometres of borders of one of the ancient world's largest empires.

Derbent Caspian Gate
A similar Sasanian defence wall and fortification lies on the opposite, western, side of the Caspian Sea at the port of Derbent, in the Republic of Dagestan, Russia.

Derbent and its Caspian Gates are at the western part of the historical region of Hyrcania. While the fortification and walls on the east side of the Caspian Sea remained unknown to the Graeco-Roman historians, the western half of the impressive "northern fortifications" in the Caucasus were well known to Classical authors.

See also
Hadrian's Wall
Gates of Alexander
Iranian Architecture

Notes

FURTHER READING
 Chaichian, Mohammad Empires and Walls: Globalization, Migration, and Colonial Control, chapter 3, 2014 Brill: Leiden .

External links

Aerial view in the Mazandarani wiki
Gorgan's Great Red Snake (Science Daily, February 2008)
Secrets of the Great Wall of Gorgan (Red Snake)
Pictures & Diagrams of the Great Wall of Gorgan
Atlas Obscura page

Buildings and structures completed in the 1st century
Archaeological sites in Iran
Archaeology of Iran
Buildings and structures in Golestan Province
Sassanian fortifications
Fortification lines
1st-century fortifications
Sasanian defense lines
6th-century fortifications
5th-century fortifications
Walls in Iran
Fortifications in Iran
Walls